This is a list of 106 species in Osbornellus, a genus of leafhoppers in the family Cicadellidae.

Osbornellus species

 Osbornellus aculeus DeLong & Martinson 1976 c g
 Osbornellus acuminatus DeLong 1942 c g
 Osbornellus affinis Osborn 1923 c g
 Osbornellus alatus Beamer, 1937 c g b
 Osbornellus alaudus DeLong 1942 c g
 Osbornellus albocinctus DeLong 1941 c g
 Osbornellus albolineus DeLong 1941 c g
 Osbornellus alveus DeLong & Martinson 1976 c g
 Osbornellus amplus DeLong 1982 c g
 Osbornellus angustatus DeLong 1976 c g
 Osbornellus anonae Linnavuori 1959 c g
 Osbornellus antlerus DeLong & Martinson 1976 c g
 Osbornellus appressus DeLong 1942 c g
 Osbornellus arabicus Dlabola 1987 c g
 Osbornellus arboropictus Dlabola 1984 c g
 Osbornellus arcus Freytag 2008 c g
 Osbornellus asperus DeLong & Martinson 1976 c g
 Osbornellus ater Beamer 1937 c g
 Osbornellus auronitens (Provancher, 1889) c g b
 Osbornellus bellus Freytag 2008 c g
 Osbornellus bergi Metcalf 1955 c g
 Osbornellus bifasciatus Beamer 1937 c g
 Osbornellus bimarginatus DeLong 1923 c g
 Osbornellus blantoni Linnavuori 1959 c g
 Osbornellus borealis DeLong & Mohr, 1936 c g b
 Osbornellus brevitubus Freytag 2008 c g
 Osbornellus candaceae Zanol 2005 c g
 Osbornellus capitatus DeLong & Knull 1941 c g
 Osbornellus cibus DeLong & Martinson 1976 c g
 Osbornellus circulus DeLong & Martinson 1976 c g
 Osbornellus clarus Beamer, 1937 c g b
 Osbornellus coloritubus Freytag 2008 c g
 Osbornellus compressus Linnavuori 1959 c g
 Osbornellus concentricus DeLong 1942 c g
 Osbornellus consors (Uhler, 1889) c g b
 Osbornellus corniger Beamer 1937 c g
 Osbornellus curvatus Beamer 1937 c g
 Osbornellus dabeki Ghauri 1980 c g
 Osbornellus decorus Beamer 1937 c g
 Osbornellus deviaticus Dlabola, 1974 g
 Osbornellus dicellus Freytag 2008 c g
 Osbornellus dicerus DeLong 1976 c g
 Osbornellus digitus DeLong & Martinson 1976 c g
 Osbornellus dipilus Freytag 2008 c g
 Osbornellus eccritus Freytag 2008 c g
 Osbornellus ecuadoricus Linnavuori 1959 c g
 Osbornellus eratus Freytag 2008 c g
 Osbornellus excavatus DeLong & Martinson 1976 c g
 Osbornellus fasciatus Metcalf 1954 c g
 Osbornellus filamenta DeLong & Beery 1937 c g
 Osbornellus fulvomaculatus Osborn 1923 c g
 Osbornellus fumidus Beamer 1937 c g
 Osbornellus furcillatus DeLong 1941 c g
 Osbornellus grandis DeLong 1942 c g
 Osbornellus hamatus DeLong & Martinson 1976 c g
 Osbornellus hispanus Freytag 2008 c g
 Osbornellus horvathi Matsumura 1908 c g
 Osbornellus hyalinus Osborn 1923 c g
 Osbornellus ignavus Ball 1936 c g
 Osbornellus infuscatus Linnavuori 1955 c g
 Osbornellus knulli DeLong & Beery 1937 c g
 Osbornellus lacunis DeLong & Martinson 1976 c g
 Osbornellus lamellaris Linnavuori 1959 c g
 Osbornellus libratus DeLong 1941 c g
 Osbornellus limosus DeLong, 1941 c g b
 Osbornellus lineatus Beamer 1937 c g
 Osbornellus lunus DeLong 1976 c g
 Osbornellus macchiae Lindberg 1948 c g
 Osbornellus mexicanus Osborn 1900 c g
 Osbornellus nigrocinctus DeLong 1942 c g
 Osbornellus omani Beamer 1937 c g
 Osbornellus pallidus Beamer 1937 c g
 Osbornellus pandus DeLong 1941 c g
 Osbornellus parallelus DeLong & Knull 1941 c g
 Osbornellus parvus Freytag 2008 c g
 Osbornellus proximus Freytag 2008 c g
 Osbornellus puniceus DeLong 1941 c g
 Osbornellus rarus DeLong 1941 c g
 Osbornellus remotus DeLong & Martinson 1976 c g
 Osbornellus respublicanus Berg 1879 c g
 Osbornellus reversus DeLong 1942 c g
 Osbornellus ritanus Ball 1932 c g
 Osbornellus rostratus DeLong 1982 c g
 Osbornellus rotundus Beamer, 1937 c g b
 Osbornellus rubellus DeLong 1941 c g
 Osbornellus rurrens DeLong 1941 c g
 Osbornellus sagarus Freytag 2008 c g
 Osbornellus salsus DeLong 1942 c g
 Osbornellus sanderanus Dlabola 1987 c g
 Osbornellus scalaris (Van Duzee, 1890) c g b
 Osbornellus separatus DeLong 1942 c g
 Osbornellus spicatus Beamer 1937 c g
 Osbornellus spinellus DeLong & Martinson 1976 c g
 Osbornellus spiniloba Linnavuori & Heller 1961 c g
 Osbornellus spinosus DeLong 1942 c g
 Osbornellus tenuis Beamer 1937 c g
 Osbornellus tetrus Freytag 2008 c g
 Osbornellus torresicus Dlabola 1967 c g
 Osbornellus trifrustrus DeLong & Martinson 1976 c g
 Osbornellus trimaculatus DeLong 1942 c g
 Osbornellus tripartitus DeLong 1941 c g
 Osbornellus tubus Freytag 2008 c g
 Osbornellus tumidus DeLong 1942 c g
 Osbornellus unicolor Osborn, 1900 c g b
 Osbornellus venustus Freytag 2008 c g
 Osbornellus vicinus Linnavuori & Heller 1961 c g

Data sources: i = ITIS, c = Catalogue of Life, g = GBIF, b = Bugguide.net

References

Osbornellus